Birkmyre is a surname. Notable people with the surname include:

Janet Birkmyre (born 1966), English track cyclist
Nicholas Birkmyre (born 1937), British rower
Birkmyre baronets